Combat Flight Simulator 2: WW II Pacific Theater is a combat flight simulator game by Microsoft released in October 2000 for the Microsoft Windows. It is the sequel to Microsoft Combat Flight Simulator. The game takes place in the Pacific War and includes campaigns loosely based on historic air battles, from the American and Japanese perspective. A sequel, Combat Flight Simulator 3: Battle for Europe, was released in 2002.

Reception

Sales
In the United States, Combat Flight Simulator 2 debuted at #11 on PC Data's computer game sales rankings for October 2000. It remained in the monthly top 20 through the end of the year.

In 2001, Combat Flight Simulator 2 achieved domestic sales of 285,728 units for revenues of $13.1 million, according to PC Data.

Critical reviews

The editors of Computer Gaming World nominated Combat Flight Simulator 2 as the best simulation game of 2000, although it lost to Comanche vs. Hokum.

References

External links
Combat Flight Simulator 2 at MobyGames

2000 video games
Flight simulation video games
Microsoft games
Pacific War video games
Video game sequels
Video games developed in the United States
Video games set in Oceania
World War II flight simulation video games
Windows games
Windows-only games